The Japan Federation of Aviation Industry Unions (JFAIU, Koku Rengo) is a trade union representing workers in the aviation industry in Japan.

The union was established in 1999, when the Japanese Confederation of Aviation Labour merged with the ANA Labour Union.  It affiliated to the Japanese Trade Union Confederation.  In 2009, the union had 36,183 members, and by 2020 its membership had grown to 41,419.

References

External links

Aviation trade unions
Trade unions in Japan
Trade unions established in 1999